Al Arz (Arabic: The Cedar) was an Arabic language newspaper which was published in Jounieh, Ottoman Lebanon. It was in circulation between 1895 and 1916.

History and profile
Al Arz was first published in October 1895. The paper was owned by Phillipe and Farid Al Khazin who were also editors. They started the paper shortly after the appointment of Phillipe Al Khazin as an honorary dragoman by the French consul. The headquarters of Al Arz was in Jounieh, and its publisher was Matbuat Al Arz (Arabic: The  Cedars  Press) owned by Al Khazin brothers.

It was a mouthpiece of the Maronite community in Lebanon and supported Lebanese nationalism. The paper supported the autonomy of Lebanon and Al Khazin brothers published articles in Al Arz claiming that Lebanon had historical "sacred rights" which should be protected by France. Some editors of the paper were members of a secret group, the Lebanese Renaissance society, which supported the independence of Lebanon as a state.

On 6 May 1916 both Phillipe and Farid Al Khazin were arrested and tried by the Ottoman authorities led by Jamal Pasha, last Ottoman governor of Syria, due to their support for the French policies. They were beheaded for treachery in Beirut, and Al Arz was shut down.

References

1895 establishments in the Ottoman Empire
1916 disestablishments in the Ottoman Empire
Arabic-language newspapers
Defunct newspapers published in Lebanon
Publications established in 1895
Publications disestablished in 1916
Phoenicianism